Shaun Carroll (born 19 April 1977) is a former professional English darts player who has played in the Professional Darts Corporation (PDC) events.

He won a PDC Challenge Tour event in 2019, which lead him to participate in many PDC Pro Tour events.

References

External links

1977 births
Living people
English darts players
Professional Darts Corporation associate players